Wigtown Bay is a large inlet of the Irish Sea on the coast of Galloway in southwest Scotland. Its coastline falls entirely within the modern administrative area of Dumfries and Galloway and shared between the historical counties of Wigtownshire and Kirkcudbrightshire.

The bay is broadly triangular in form, widening to the southeast and with the estuary of the River Cree entering from the northwest at its head. The inner parts of the bay are characterized by large expanses of salt marsh and mudflats. The River Bladnoch flows into the estuarial section of the Cree near Wigtown. The Water of Fleet is a third significant river which enters Wigtown Bay via Fleet Bay on its eastern shore. At the mouth of Fleet Bay are the Islands of Fleet include Ardwall Island, Barlocco Isle and Murray’s Isles. The western shore of the bay is formed by The Machars peninsula. This coast is itself indented by Rigg (or Cruggleton) Bay and by Garlieston Bay on which the village of Garlieston sits. The small town of Wigtown also stands on the western shore of the bay whilst the village of Creetown lies at the head of the bay.

Wigtown Bay forms the largest local nature reserve in Britain. It has also been designated as a site of special scientific interest.

A proposal to construct an offshore windfarm in Wigtown Bay was turned down by the Scottish government in early 2011. The potential effect on tourism was cited as a major reason in the decision.

Naval connections
The design of the floating Mulberry Harbour used in the successful invasion of Normandy by allied forces during the Second World War was tested in the bay where conditions were felt to be suitably similar to those of the Normandy coast. There was also a World War II Bay class frigate named Wigtown Bay

References

External links
 Save Wigtown Bay
 California, in Dumfries and Galloway

Bays of Scotland
Nature reserves in Scotland
Landforms of Dumfries and Galloway
Protected areas of Dumfries and Galloway
Solway Firth
Bays of the Irish Sea